Dennis Monokroussos (born 1966) is an American chess player, author and journalist. He holds the National Master title from the United States Chess Federation and the FIDE Master title from FIDE.

He hosts a weekly chess training session for ChessBase on their chess server.  His lecture series originally began as "Great Games in Chess History" on Chess.FM, which is now a part of the Internet Chess Club.  He has recently also begun a separate lecture series on ChessVideos.tv.

Monokroussos is best known for his blog, The Chess Mind, which features news, commentary, and highly regarded annotations of recent chess games from tournaments around the world.  He also gives private lessons in chess.

In October 2015, Monokroussos began writing a weekly column for World Chess.com, the official site of the world chess championship, which is owned by Agon, the company which also holds the commercial rights to organize the world championship.

Born in New York City, Monokroussos grew up in Las Vegas.  He currently lives in South Bend, Indiana.

References

External links
 
 
 
 
 Mr. Monokroussos' blog
 Mr. Monokroussos' previous blog

1966 births
American chess players
American non-fiction writers
American chess writers
American male non-fiction writers
Chess FIDE Masters
Living people